HD 197630, also known as HR 7933 or rarely 23 G. Microscopii, is a probable astrometric binary located in the southern constellation Microscopium. The visible component is a bluish-white hued star that is faintly visible to the naked eye with an apparent magnitude of 5.47. Based on parallax measurements from the Gaia satellite, the system is estimated to be 328 light years away. At its current distance, HD 197630's brightness is diminished by 0.11 magnitudes due to interstellar dust. A 2012 multiplicity survey failed to confirm the velocity variations.

HD 197630 has a stellar classification of B8/9 V, indicating that it is a B-type star with the characteristics of a B8 and B9 main sequence star. It has 2.83 times the mass of the Sun and 2.56 times the Sun's radius. The star is estimated to be 113 million years old, having completed roughly half of its main sequence lifetime.

The object was in a 2002 Hipparcos variability survey and as a result, the AAVSO cataloged HD 197630 as a suspected variable star that fluctuates by 0.005 magnitudes within 7.71 hours. However, subsequent observations have not confirmed this. Further data from the Transiting Exoplanet Survey Satellite suggests that HD 197630 may be a slowly pulsating B-type star plus a variable star with rotation modulations.

References

B-type main-sequence stars
Slowly pulsating B stars
High-proper-motion stars
Microscopium
Microscopii, 23
CD-39 13960
197630
102497
7933